Maximiliano José Osurak (born 23 October 1991) is an Argentine professional footballer who plays as a forward for Sol de Mayo.

Career
Independiente Rivadavia signed Osurak from Colón de San Justo. He featured four times throughout the 2013–14 Primera B Nacional campaign, including for his professional debut on 4 August 2013 against Sportivo Belgrano. January 2015 saw the forward join Deportivo Guaymallén, with twelve appearances and one goal following in Torneo Federal B. Moves to Colón de San Justo, an ex-club, and 9 de Julio followed in 2015, before Osurak joined Belgrano in early 2016. On 30 June 2016, Osurak was signed by Torneo Federal A's San Jorge. He netted goals against Juventud Antoniana and Concepción during 2016.

In January 2017, Osurak switched Argentina for Honduras by joining Liga Nacional side Platense. He made his bow for the club on 29 January versus Social Sol, scoring his first goal in the process as Platense won 2–1. In total, Osurak participated in fourteen fixtures and scored three for the Honduran club. He subsequently rejoined Belgrano in mid-2017, prior to moving to Atlético Paraná on 1 January 2018. After four goals in nine games for them, Santamarina of Primera B Nacional signed Osurak.

Career statistics
.

References

External links

1991 births
Living people
Argentine footballers
Argentine expatriate footballers
Footballers from Santa Fe, Argentina
Association football forwards
Independiente Rivadavia footballers
Deportivo Guaymallén players
9 de Julio de Rafaela players
San Jorge de Tucumán footballers
Platense F.C. players
Club Atlético Paraná players
Club y Biblioteca Ramón Santamarina footballers
Chaco For Ever footballers
Primera Nacional players
Torneo Federal A players
Liga Nacional de Fútbol Profesional de Honduras players
Argentine expatriate sportspeople in Honduras
Argentine expatriate sportspeople in Greece
Expatriate footballers in Honduras
Expatriate footballers in Greece